The Cavalier Specialists Invitational was a golf tournament played at the Cavalier Yacht & Country Club in Virginia Beach, Virginia. It was played from 1948 to 1950. The tournament was played over 54 holes. A separate team event was also played.

Winners

References

Former PGA Tour events
Golf in Virginia